The Fire & Security Association (FSA), based in London, is a trade association that represents businesses who “design, install, commission, maintain and monitor systems covering fire, emergency and security”. Established in 2007, the FSA works in partnership with The Scottish Electrical Contractors Association (SELECT), and is a specialist group of the Electrical Contractors’ Association (ECA).

References

External links 

Trade associations based in the United Kingdom
British Standards